Stefano Malinverni (born 14 May 1959) was an Italian sprinter who specialized in the 400 metres.

Biography
He won six medals at the International athletics competitions, four of these with national relays team. He participated at one edition of the Summer Olympics (1980), he has 36 caps in national team from 1977 to 1986.

He won a bronze medal in the 4 x 400 metres relay at the 1980 Summer Olympics, with teammates Mauro Zuliani, Roberto Tozzi and Pietro Mennea. His personal best time is 46.09 seconds, achieved in July 1981 in Milan.

Achievements

National titles
He has won 5 times the individual national championship.
3 wins in the 400 metres (1979, 1980, 1981)
2 wins in the 400 metres indoor (1979, 1980)

See also
 Italy national relay team

References

External links
 

1959 births
Living people
People from Cinisello Balsamo
Italian male sprinters
Athletes (track and field) at the 1980 Summer Olympics
Olympic athletes of Italy
Olympic bronze medalists for Italy
World Athletics Championships athletes for Italy
Athletics competitors of Fiamme Oro
Olympic bronze medalists in athletics (track and field)
Universiade medalists in athletics (track and field)
Mediterranean Games bronze medalists for Italy
Mediterranean Games medalists in athletics
Athletes (track and field) at the 1979 Mediterranean Games
Universiade bronze medalists for Italy
Medalists at the 1980 Summer Olympics
Italian Athletics Championships winners
Medalists at the 1979 Summer Universiade
Sportspeople from the Metropolitan City of Milan